Fairgrounds Field is a ballpark located in Robstown, Texas.  It was the home stadium of the Coastal Bend Thunder of the United League Baseball and the Corpus Christi Fuel of the Southern Premier Soccer League and the former home of the Corpus Christi Beach Dawgs of the Continental Baseball League and the Coastal Bend Aviators.  The Richard M. Borchard Regional Fairgrounds is an ongoing development project involving the area surrounding the existing stadium.

External links 
Richard M. Borchard Regional Fairgrounds

Minor league baseball venues
Baseball venues in Texas
Sports venues completed in 2003